Charles Willard Diffin (1884-1966) was an American engineer, salesman and author. He is known best for his science-fiction stories, although he published several works in the genres of Western and mystery.

He debuted in 1930 in the science fiction magazine Astounding Stories.

References 

1884 births
1966 deaths
American science fiction writers
American engineers